The European and African Zone was one of the three zones of regional Davis Cup competition in 2005.

In the European and African Zone there were four different groups in which teams competed against each other to advance to the next group.

Participating teams

Draw 

Zimbabwe and South Africa relegated to Group II in 2006.
Great Britain, Belgium, Italy, and Germany advance to World Group Play-off.

First Round Matches

Serbia and Montenegro vs. Zimbabwe

Italy vs. Luxembourg

Second Round Matches

Great Britain vs. Israel

Belgium vs. Serbia and Montenegro

Italy vs. Morocco

South Africa vs. Germany

First Round Play-offs Matches

Luxembourg vs. Morocco

Second Round Play-offs Matches

Israel vs. Zimbabwe

Morocco vs. South Africa

References

Main Draw

2005 Davis Cup Europe/Africa Zone
Davis Cup Europe/Africa Zone